This is a list of the National Register of Historic Places listings in Young County, Texas.

This is intended to be a complete list of properties listed on the National Register of Historic Places in Young County, Texas. There are five properties listed on the National Register in the county. These include two National Historic Landmarks one of which is also a Recorded Texas Historic Landmark (RTHL) while containing an additional RTHL. One additional property is also an RTHL.

Current listings

The publicly disclosed locations of National Register properties may be seen in a mapping service provided.

|}

See also

National Register of Historic Places listings in Texas
List of National Historic Landmarks in Texas
Recorded Texas Historic Landmarks in Young County

References

External links

Young County, Texas
Young County
Buildings and structures in Young County, Texas